Isle of Inishmore may refer to:

 Inishmore, the largest of the Aran Islands off the west coast of Ireland
 , a ferry operated by B&I Line and Irish Ferries 1993-1996 
 , a cruiseferry operated by Irish Ferries since 1997